"" (which has been translated as "Welcome Vision", but can also be read as "Pleasant Daydream") is both a German poem by Otto Bierbaum and a Lied (art song) by Richard Strauss, his Op. 48/1. The opening line is "Nicht im Schlafe hab ich das geträumt" ("I did not dream this while asleep"). It is the first of a set of five songs by Strauss composed in 1900 and published in Berlin in 1901 by Adolph Fürstner. The works were scored for voice and piano, and arranged for voice and orchestra in 1918 by the composer.

Poem 

"" first appeared in Irrgarten der Liebe (Maze of love) in Berlin and Leipzig in 1901. The full title of the collection of songs, poems and aphorisms is "Der Neubestellte Irrgarten Der Liebe: Um Etliche Gaenge Und Lauben Vermehrt, Verliebte Launenhafte, Moralische Und Andere Lieder, Gedichte U. Sprueche. Bis 1905.", where it appears in the section "Bilder und Traeume" (Images and dreams).

Freundliche VisionNicht im Schlafe hab' ich das geträumt,
Hell am Tage sah ich's schön vor mir:
Eine Wiese voller Margeritten;
Tief ein weißes Haus in grünen Büschen;
Götterbilder leuchten aus dem Laube.
Und ich geh' mit Einer, die mich lieb hat,
Ruhigen Gemütes in die Kühle
Dieses weißen Hauses, in den Frieden,
Der voll Schönheit wartet, daß wir kommen.

Pleasant DaydreamNot in my sleep did I dream it,
Saw it in broad daylight lovely before me:
A meadow full of dill daisies,
A white house deep in greenery,
Godlike figures shining among the leaves.
And I go there with one who loves me,
Quiet of mind in the cool
Of this white house at peace,
Waiting full of beauty for us to come.

Composition history 

Strauss composed "", along with the other four songs of Op. 48, in 1900. This song sets a poem by Otto Julius Bierbaum, while the other four set poems by Karl Henckell. Strauss composed art songs as a transition between working in instrumental music and opera; he wrote his first opera, Feuersnot, the same year.

He originally scored the five songs for voice and piano. The songs were published in 1901 by Adolph Fürstner. Strauss also made an arrangement for voice and orchestra in 1918. "" is among the songs that the composer presented in more than one program on tours of the US, in Carnegie Hall in 1904, and in 1921 in Town Hall in two recitals.

Julius Patzak and the Bavarian State Opera Orchestra broadcast a particularly noteworthy version, which is consistent with Strauss's “preference ... for fastish speeds without sentimentality.”

Music 
""  has features in common with "Traum durch die Dämmerung", also on a text by Bierbaum, including a shift of key, here to illustrate the contrast of sleeping and a vision while awake. Strauss repeats for the last two lines elements from before, "" (And I walk with one who loves me), condensing the text that took three lines before to "in den Frieden voll Schönheit" (into the peace full of beauty), sung over a tonic pedalpoint in the same pattern as all of the song.

By other composers 
The poem "" also inspired other composers, such as Max Reger, who set lines 3 to 9 to music as No. 2 of his Zwölf Lieder, Op. 66, in 1902. Lutz Landwehr von Pragenau set the poem in 1979 for baritone and piano as his Op. 1/1 in Zwei Lieder für Bariton und Klavier.

References

External links 
 
 Richard Strauss / Freundliche Vision ("Nicht im Schlafe hab' ich das geträumt"), song for voice & piano (or orchestra), Op. 48/1 (TrV 202/1) AllMusic
  Freundliche Vision, Op. 48/1 / Richard Strauss  BBC

Songs by Richard Strauss
1900 songs
Songs based on poems